The 13th Lavant Cup was an Intercontinental Formula motor race held on 3 April 1961 at Goodwood Circuit, West Sussex. The race was run over 21 laps of the circuit, and was won by British driver Stirling Moss in a Cooper T53-Climax. Bruce McLaren started from pole, set fastest lap and finished second in another T53. Graham Hill was third in a BRM P48. The event was held on the same day as the 1961 Pau Grand Prix, which compromised the quality of the entry at both meetings.

Results

References

Lavant Cup
Lavant Cup
20th century in West Sussex
Lavant